Archelaos Katerinis (full name Gymnastikos Athlitikos Syllogos Archelaos Katerinis, GAS Archelaos Katerinis – ) is a Greek multisport club based in Katerini. The club has sport departments in various sports, but the most successful is the handball team. The handball team has won two Greek cup.

History
Archelaos Katerinis was founded in 1956. Initially the club had also a basketball team. This team was merged with Pierikos in 2008 and it continues as Archelaos-Pierikos B.C. The most successful team of the club is the handball team. The handball team of Archelaos was founded in 1980 and it has won 2 Greek Cups (1990, 1994) and was one time the finalist of the championship. In the recent season, Archelaos finished in second place of A2 Ethniki Handball but it was promoted to A1 replacing Ionikos Nea Filadelfeia that withdrew.

Recent seasons

Honours
Greek Cups 
Winner (2): 1990, 1994

References

Archelaos Katerinis
Katerini